Rear Admiral (UH) Raymond A. Spicer of the United States Navy is the former director of the White House Military Office and Deputy Assistant to the President.  RADM Spicer reported as Deputy Assistant to the President and Director, White House Military Office in March 2007, and was succeeded by Louis Caldera in January 2009.

Background 

A native of Triangle, Virginia, Ray Spicer graduated from the U.S. Naval Academy in 1979 with a Bachelor of Science in Ocean Engineering.

His assignments at sea include Damage Control Assistant and Combat Information Center Officer aboard , Weapons Officer and Combat Systems Officer aboard , Executive Officer, Commanding Officer, and Commander, Destroyer Squadron 7. During these operational tours, he completed eight deployments to the Western Pacific/Indian Ocean, Mediterranean Sea and Persian Gulf. His most recent sea duty was as the Commander, Carrier Strike Group 12 and Commander, Enterprise Strike Group. During that tour he deployed in 2006 to the Persian Gulf and Western Pacific, and the strike group participated in combat operations in Iraq and Afghanistan, supporting Operations Iraqi Freedom and Enduring Freedom.

Ashore, he served as operations briefer to the Secretary of the Navy and Chief of Naval Operations (CNO), Naval Aide to the Vice Chief of Naval Operations and Flag Lieutenant to the Commander, U.S. Pacific Command. Other shore duty included assignments as Officer in Charge of the Aegis Combat System Engineering Development Site in Moorestown, N.J.; Executive Assistant to the Deputy and Chief of Staff, U.S. Atlantic Fleet; Executive Assistant to the Commander, U.S. Pacific Fleet; Deputy and Chief of Staff for the Commander, Naval Surface Force, U.S. Pacific Fleet; and Deputy for Surface Ships (N76E) and Deputy Director of Surface Warfare (N76B) on the staff of the Chief of Naval Operations.

References

1950s births
Living people
People from Prince William County, Virginia
United States Navy admirals
United States Naval Academy alumni
United States Navy personnel of the Iraq War